The Voodoo Music + Arts Experience (formerly The Voodoo Music Experience), commonly referred to as Voodoo or Voodoo Fest, is a multi-day music and arts festival held in City Park in New Orleans, Louisiana.

The Voodoo Experience has hosted more than 2000 artists and over one million festival-goers during its existence. The festival has been twice nominated for Pollstar's Music Festival of the Year. It was acquired by Live Nation Entertainment in 2013 and is produced by C3 Presents. Don Kelly, Voodoo's former General Counsel and COO, is Festival Director and oversees the event.

The Voodoo Experience is known for including national artists from all genres, such as Stone Temple Pilots, Foo Fighters, Marilyn Manson, Pearl Jam, Metallica, Rage Against the Machine, Muse, Eminem, Red Hot Chili Peppers, Arcade Fire, Tiësto, Nine Inch Nails, KISS, R.E.M., Modest Mouse, Thirty Seconds to Mars, Calvin Harris, The Weeknd, Deadmau5, The Black Keys, Neil Young, Green Day, Snoop Dogg, Duran Duran, Porcupine Tree, The Smashing Pumpkins, My Chemical Romance, 50 Cent, Cowboy Mouth and 311 as well as local Louisiana musicians such as The Original Meters, Trombone Shorty and Orleans Avenue, The Preservation Hall Jazz Band, Rebirth Brass Band, and Dr. John.

History
Since its 1999 Halloween weekend debut, the annual event has become a Halloween tradition for music fans, both locally and others who travel from around the world. Throughout Voodoo’s -year run, more than one million festival-goers have gathered to see performances from about 2,000 artists. The event has also been twice nominated for Pollstar's Music Festival of the Year and in 2005, Voodoo founder Stephen Rehage and his team were presented with a key to the city, following the Voodoo 2005 post-Katrina event.

Creation and growth

Voodoo was first held as a single day event on October 30, 1999, at Tad Gormley Stadium in City Park. Planned and executed by Stephen Rehage, CEO of Rehage Entertainment, the festival consisted of three stages and a mix of local and national acts including headliners Wyclef Jean and Moby. 
As the U.S. festival market swelled, Voodoo continued its growth, increasing both the festival site and musically expanding with the addition of stages and performers.

During its second year in 2000, Voodoo became a two-day event, and garnered international attention with a headlining performance from Eminem in support of his debut album The Slim Shady LP. In 2007, Voodoo expanded to a three-day event.

Hurricane Katrina

Originally scheduled for Halloween Weekend in New Orleans’ City Park, the Voodoo Music Experience was displaced by the tragedy of Hurricane Katrina.  While plans were in full swing to move forward with a relocation to Memphis, Voodoo founder Stephen Rehage met with community leaders in New Orleans about the opportunity to move the event back home for one of its two days—as a tribute event for relief workers.  Festival organizers and Memphis representatives alike agreed this was an amazing opportunity to increase the scope of the event.

New Orleans event 
On October 29, 2005, an invitation-only celebration (previous ticket holders exempt) for police, firefighters, National Guard, military and countless others who had aided in the recovery efforts of the city was staged at the Riverview "Butterfly" section of Audubon Park in New Orleans, one of the few public spaces in the city not damaged in the recent Federal levee failure disaster . Nine Inch Nails, Queens of the Stone Age, The Secret Machines, the New York Dolls, and Kermit Ruffins were among the artists who all came together in celebration of a city they love.

It marked the first major multi-musical performance in the two months since Hurricane Katrina’s effects were felt in the city.

Memphis event
Voodoo in Memphis included a fundraiser for victims of the Hurricane Katrina disaster in AutoZone Park.

2006–2015
The 2006 Voodoo Music Experience saw the debut of three distinct areas on six distinct stages within the festivals landscape: Le Ritual, Le Flambeau and Le Carnival.  Each of these areas was designed to uniquely showcase different sides of the personality of the festival and its New Orleans home: "Le Flambeau" features music and sounds consistent with the style of The Big Easy; "Le Ritual" features more mainstream music; and finally "Le Carnival" features indie bands, burlesque and circus acts.

In 2007, Voodoo expanded to three days and broke all previous attendance records with an estimated 100,000+ fans in attendance.

In April 2013, the Voodoo Music + Arts Experience announced an initial 15 acts to commemorate the 15th anniversary of Voodoo. The initial 15 acts include Pearl Jam, Nine Inch Nails, Calvin Harris, Bassnectar, Paramore, Macklemore & Ryan Lewis, Afrojack, Boys Noize, The Gaslight Anthem, Big Gigantic, How To Destroy Angels, Cults, Alkaline Trio, Desaparecidos and Robert DeLong. The 15th anniversary Voodoo celebration also marked the debut of City Park’s Festival Grounds, a new permanent home for Voodoo.  Home to Voodoo since its 1999 debut—with the exception of Voodoo 2005, which was displaced by the city’s hurricane damage—New Orleans’ 1,300-acre City Park is the region’s principal recreation site that attracts over seven million visitors each year.

In October 2013, a controlling stake in the festival was sold to Live Nation Entertainment, amid growing financial issues. Rehage retained a 49% stake in the event, and became Live Nation's President of North American Festivals.

The final day of the 2015 edition was canceled due to inclement weather.

2016–2022
In 2016, operations for the festival were taken over by Live Nation subsidiary C3 Presents, organizers of Lollapalooza and the Austin City Limits Music Festival, with Sig Greenebaum and Don Kelly promoted to co-directors in place of Rehage. With the new management, the festival underwent changes to its stage layout and infrastructure. Attendance peaked at around 150,000. The 2019 festival was hampered by Tropical Storm Olga, which brought extensive rain to the New Orleans area.

The 2020 festival was canceled due to the COVID-19 pandemic. Although it initially announced plans to return in 2021, Voodoo announced in June 2021 that the festival had been cancelled and will not be held again until 2022, with no reasoning given.  In June 2022, it was announced that the 2022 festival would not be held.

Line-ups

1999
The 1999 Voodoo Music + Arts Experience was held on October 31, 1999.

2000
The 2000 Voodoo Music + Arts Experience was held from October 27–29, 2000.

2001
The 2001 Voodoo Music + Arts Experience was held from October 26–28, 2001.

2002
The 2002 Voodoo Music + Arts Experience was held from October 25–27, 2002.

2003
The 2003 Voodoo Music + Arts Experience was held from October 31-November 1, 2003.

2004
The 2004 Voodoo Music + Arts Experience was held from October 29–31, 2004.

2005
The 2005 Voodoo Music + Arts Experience was held on October 29–30, 2005 in New Orleans and Memphis.

2006
The 2006 Voodoo Music + Arts Experience was held from October 28–29, 2006.

2007
The 2007 Voodoo Music + Arts Experience was held from October 26–28, 2007.

2008
The 2008 Voodoo Music + Arts Experience was held from October 24–26, 2008.

2009
The 2009 Voodoo Music + Arts Experience was held from October 30-November 1, 2009.

2010
The 2010 Voodoo Music + Arts Experience was held from October 29–31, 2010.

2011
The 2011 Voodoo Music + Arts Experience was held from October 28–30, 2011.

2012
The 2012 Voodoo Music + Arts Experience was held from October 26–28, 2012.

2013 
The 2013 Voodoo Music + Arts Experience was held from November 1–3, 2013.

2014
The 2014 Voodoo Music + Arts Experience was held from October 31-November 2, 2014.

2015
The 2015 Voodoo Music + Arts Experience was held from October 30-November 1, 2015.

2016 
The 2016 Voodoo Music + Arts Experience was held from October 28–30, 2016. During their Sunday headlining set, Arcade Fire recorded the audience singing a melody for an unreleased song for its upcoming album, which later became "Everything Now".

2017
The 2017 Voodoo Music + Arts Experience was held October 27–29, 2017.

2018
The 2018 Voodoo Music + Arts Experience was held October 26–28, 2018.

2019
The 2019 Voodoo Music + Arts Experience was held October 25–27, 2019.

2022
On June 10, 2022, festival organizers confirmed in an announcement on social media and the festival’s website that the event won't happen this year, calling it a “pause.”

See also

List of historic rock festivals

References

External links

Official website

Companies based in New Orleans
Festivals in New Orleans
Music festivals in Louisiana
Music festivals established in 1999
Rock festivals in the United States
Tourist attractions in New Orleans
Folk festivals in the United States
Jazz festivals in Louisiana